Nothing is an American shoegaze band that formed in 2010. The band self-released several EPs before signing to Relapse Records. They released their debut studio album, Guilty of Everything, in 2014. The follow-up album, Tired of Tomorrow, was released on in 2016. Nothing's third studio album, Dance on the Blacktop, was released in 2018, and their fourth studio album, The Great Dismal, was released in 2020.

History
Nothing founder Domenic "Nicky" Palermo was previously a member of the hardcore punk band Horror Show. The short-lived band only released a pair of EPs through Jacob Bannon of Converge's Deathwish Inc. label during its existence. Horror Show was put on hold in 2002 when a 20-year old Palermo stabbed a man during a fight between two rival gangs and spent two years in jail for aggravated assault and attempted murder; Palermo claimed self-defense. Of this period in his life, Palermo said: "It was kind of a violent time. We were going to shows and kind of, like, fucking shit up for the whole [hardcore] scene". He also performed in XO Skeletons, which featured Wesley Eisold (Give Up the Ghost, Cold Cave).

Following his stint in jail and done with performing in punk bands, Palermo spent a long time soul-searching. He has said, "I didn't know what else to do with my life, what would make me want to wake up every day. I really struggled with that for like four years and, not to sound dramatic or anything, but I thought about blowing my brains out every day". Palermo eventually began making music again, and released a demo, Poshlost, under the name "Nothing" in 2011. Nothing went through several lineup changes over the next few years while releasing two EPs, Suns and Lovers and Downward Years to Come in 2012.

In 2013 Nothing signed to Relapse Records and released the single "Dig", which featured on the band's debut album, Guilty of Everything, released by Relapse on March 4, 2014. To continue promotion for the album, Nothing also released the tracks "Endlessly" and "Bent Nail" for online streaming, and in 2014 it reissued Downward Years to Come.

In August 2013 Nothing toured with Whirr, and as a result, members of Nothing and Whirr formed a side project called Death of Lovers. The two bands also released a split EP in 2014, and Whirr member Nick Bassett (ex-Deafheaven)  joined Nothing on bass.

Nothing then signed to Collect Records, but terminated its contract with the label after completing their new record, due to the label's ties to former Turing Pharmaceuticals CEO Martin Shkreli. On December 8, 2015, it was announced that Nothing had re-signed with Relapse Records. Its second album, Tired of Tomorrow, was released on May 13, 2016. The first single from the album, "Vertigo Flowers", debuted on February 23, 2016. Chris Betts returned to tour for the record, as Bassett was busy with Whirr.

The band's third studio album, Dance on the Blacktop, was released on August 24, 2018, by Relapse. It was preceded by the "Zero Day" single on June 4. 

After the recording of the album, new bassist Aaron Heard (vocalist for hardcore band Jesus Piece), replaced Bassett. Founding guitarist/vocalist Brandon Setta left the band mid-tour due to personal reasons in 2019 and continues to release music under the name White Lighters. He was replaced by Cloakroom frontman Doyle Martin.

On October 30, 2020 The Great Dismal was released on Relapse Records. Promotional videos were released for the songs "Say Less", "Bernie Sanders", "Famine Asylum", "April Ha Ha (Ft. Alex G.)", and "Catch a Fade". Production was handled by Will Yip, who previously produced the band's second record, Tired of Tomorrow. This is the first album to feature Doyle Martin replacing Brandon Setta on guitar and vocals, as well as Aaron Heard replacing longtime bassist Nick Bassett.

On January 5, 2022, Aaron Heard posted that his few upcoming shows with Nothing would be his last, in order to spend more time raising his son. On February 28, 2022, Gouge Away frontwoman Christina Michelle replaced Heard on bass.

Discography

Studio albums
 Guilty of Everything (2014, Relapse)
 Tired of Tomorrow (2016, Relapse)
 Dance on the Blacktop (2018, Relapse)
 The Great Dismal (2020, Relapse)

Singles and EPs
 Poshlost demo EP (2011, Like Glue)
 Suns and Lovers EP (2012, Big Love)
 Downward Years to Come EP (2012, A389)
 "Dig" single (2013, Relapse) 
 Whirr / Nothing (split with Whirr) (2014, Run for Cover) 
 "ACD" Record Store Day single (2016, Relapse)
"Vertigo Flowers" (2016, Relapse)
 "Zero Day" (2018, Relapse) 
 "Blue Line Baby" (2018, Relapse)
 "The Carpenter's Son" (2018, Relapse)
 "Say Less" (2020, Relapse)

Compilation appearances
"Something in the Way" (Nirvana cover) on Whatever Nevermind (2015, Robotic Empire)

Members

Current 
 Domenic "Nicky" Palermo - vocals (2010-present), guitar (2010-2011, 2012-present), keyboards, synthesizer (2010-2012)
 Kyle Kimball - drums (2013-present)
 Doyle Martin - guitar, backing vocals (2019-present)
 Christina Michelle - bass (2022-present)

Current live/touring members
 Zachary Jones - drums (2022-present)

Former live/touring members
 Ben "Benny" Mead - drums (2022)
 Nah - drums (2022)

Former 

 Aaron Heard - bass (2018-2022)
 Brandon Setta - guitar, vocals (2011-2019)
 Nick Bassett - bass, piano, keyboards (2013-2018)
 AJ Annunziata - bass (2013)
 Chris Betts - bass (2012-2013, 2016-2017 (touring))
 Michael Bachich - drums (2011-2013)
 Joshua Jancewicz - bass (2011-2012)
 Ryan Grotz - guitar (2011-2012)

References

External links

 
 Nothing at Bandcamp
 Nothing discography at Rate Your Music
 Nothing discography at Discogs

Alternative rock groups from Pennsylvania
Dream pop musical groups
2010 establishments in Pennsylvania
Musical groups from Philadelphia
Musical quartets
Relapse Records artists
American shoegaze musical groups